Stephen Hinkson (born 4 January 1942) is a Barbadian cricketer. He played in one first-class match for the Barbados cricket team in 1973/74.

See also
 List of Barbadian representative cricketers

References

External links
 

1942 births
Living people
Barbadian cricketers
Barbados cricketers
Cricketers from Bridgetown